Crosland or Crossland is a surname, and may refer to

In arts and media
 William Henry Crossland (1834-1909), British architect
 Thomas William Hodgson Crosland (1865-1924), British author
 Alan Crosland (1894-1936), American film director
 Philip Crosland (1918-2012) British journalist
 Jalan Crossland (fl. from 2000), American bluegrass singer and musician
 Jill Crossland  (fl. from 2001), British pianist

In business
 Leonard Crossland (1914-1999), British automobile executive

In government, military, and politics
 Thomas Crosland MP, (1816-1868), English parliamentarian
 Edward Crossland (1827-1881), Confederate officer in the American Civil War
 Sir Joseph Crosland MP (1826-1904), English parliamentarian
 Anthony Crosland (1918-1977), British politician

In science and engineering
 Charles Crossland (1844–1916), English mycologist
 Cyril Crossland (1878-1943), English zoologist
 Bernard Crossland (born 1923), British engineer
 Ronald Crossland (1920-2006), English classical scholar

In sport
 John Crossland (1852-1903), English cricketer
 Samuel Crossland (1851-1908), English cricketer
 Nealy Crosland (1880-1929), English rugby league footballer
 John Crosland (1922-2006), English professional footballer

Places
Crossland, Kentucky, a town in the United States
Crossland, Ontario, a community in Canada
Crossland High School, a school in Maryland